Michaël Isabey (born 20 February 1975 in Pontarlier, Doubs) is a French football coach and former player who played as a midfielder. He is currently the manager of Dijon FCO's U19 squad. While at Sochaux he played as a substitute as they won the 2004 Coupe de la Ligue Final.

Coaching career
Isabey was appointed manager of Racing Besançon in June 2014. He left the position in March 2017.

On 20 June 2019, Dijon FCO announced, that they had hired Isabey as manager for the U19 squad.

References

External links

1975 births
Living people
People from Pontarlier
Sportspeople from Doubs
Association football midfielders
French footballers
French football managers
Racing Besançon players
FC Sochaux-Montbéliard players
Dijon FCO players
Ligue 1 players
Ligue 2 players
Footballers from Bourgogne-Franche-Comté